Red Dragon is a 2002 psychological thriller film based on the 1981 novel by Thomas Harris. It was directed by Brett Ratner and written by Ted Tally. It is the third film of the MGM-Universal production, last starred by actor Anthony Hopkins. It follows The Silence of the Lambs (1991) and Hannibal (2001) as a prequel, being followed by Hannibal Rising (2007), it sees FBI agent Will Graham (Edward Norton) enlisting the help of serial killer Hannibal Lecter (Anthony Hopkins) to catch another killer, Francis Dolarhyde (Ralph Fiennes). Harvey Keitel, Emily Watson, Mary-Louise Parker, and Philip Seymour Hoffman also star.

It is considered the fourth of the five released films regarding Hannibal Lecter. The novel was previously adapted into the film Manhunter (1986). Both films feature the same cinematographer, Dante Spinotti. After turning down the Silence of the Lambs sequel, Hannibal (2001), Silence of the Lambs screenwriter Ted Tally returned to write Red Dragon. It was released on October 4, 2002 to mostly positive reviews from critics and was a box office success, earning $209 million worldwide.

Plot 
In 1980, FBI agent Will Graham visits forensic psychiatrist Hannibal Lecter to discuss a case. Graham has been working with Lecter on a psychological profile of a serial killer who removes edible body parts from his victims; Graham is certain the killer is a cannibal. Realizing Graham is close to discovering he is the killer, Lecter stabs him, but Graham subdues him before falling unconscious. Lecter is imprisoned in an institution for the criminally insane, and Graham, traumatized, retires to Florida with his family.

Years later, in 1986, another serial killer nicknamed the Tooth Fairy has killed two familiesthe Jacobis' and The Leeds'during full moons. With another full moon approaching, special agent Jack Crawford persuades Graham to help develop the killer's profile. After visiting the crime scenes in Atlanta, Georgia, and Birmingham, Alabama, and speaking with Crawford, Graham concludes that he must consult Lecter. Lecter taunts Graham but agrees to help.

The Tooth Fairy is Francis Dolarhyde, who kills as directed by his alternate personality, which he calls the Great Red Dragon, named after the William Blake painting The Great Red Dragon and the Woman Clothed in Sun, which he has tattooed on his back. He believes that each victim brings him closer to becoming the Dragon, as his psychopathology originates from his childhood abuse by his grandmother.

Freddy Lounds, a tabloid reporter for the National Tattler, pursues Graham for leads on the Tooth Fairy. A letter from the Tooth Fairy is discovered hidden in Lecter's cell, expressing admiration for Lecter and an interest in Graham and suggesting that Lecter reply through the personals section of the Tattler, which he does with Graham's home address, forcing Graham's wife, Molly, and son, Josh, to relocate. While in hiding, Graham teaches Molly how to fire a handgun.

To lure out the Tooth Fairy, Graham gives an interview to Lounds, disparaging the killer as an impotent homosexual. Enraged, Dolarhyde kidnaps Lounds, glues him to a wheelchair and reveals himself as the Great Red Dragon. Dolarhyde shows Lounds photos he took of his victims before and after he murdered them. Dolarhyde forces Lounds to recant his allegations on tape, sets him on fire and sends him rolling and crashing into a company sign outside the Tattler offices.

At his job in a St. Louis photo lab, Dolarhyde gives Reba McClane, a blind co-worker, a ride to her home and they begin a relationship. However, his alternate personality demands that he kill her. Desperate to stop the Dragon's control over him, Dolarhyde goes to the Brooklyn Museum, tears apart the Blake painting, and eats it.

Graham realizes that the Tooth Fairy knew the layout of his victims' houses from their home videos. He deduces that he works for the company that edits the home movies and transfers them to video. He visits the company processing plant to ask for information, and is spotted by Dolarhyde as he returns from Brooklyn.

In a panic, Dolarhyde goes to Reba's house. She has spent the evening with a co-worker, Ralph Mandy. After Reba enters her home, Dolarhyde kills Ralph, kidnaps Reba, takes her to his house, and sets it ablaze. Unable to shoot her, Dolarhyde apparently shoots himself. Reba escapes as the police arrive.

After an autopsy is performed on the corpse, it is revealed that Dolarhyde used Ralph's body to stage his death. Dolarhyde later infiltrates Graham's home in Florida and takes Josh hostage, threatening to kill him. To save Josh, Graham loudly insults him, reminding Dolarhyde of his grandmother's abuse and provoking him to furiously attack Graham. Both are severely wounded in a shootout, which ends when Molly kills Dolarhyde.

Graham survives and receives a letter from Lecter praising his work and bidding him well. Lecter's jailer, Dr. Frederick Chilton, tells him that he has a visitor, a young woman from the FBI.

Cast

Production 
The 1991 film The Silence of the Lambs, starring Anthony Hopkins as Lecter, was a critical and commercial success, winning five Academy Awards. Hopkins was the only major member of the Silence of the Lambs team to return for the 2001 sequel, Hannibal; it was also a commercial success, but received less positive reviews. Both films were adapted from novels by Thomas Harris.

Husband-and-wife producers Dino and Martha De Laurentiis decided to produce a film based on the 1981 novel Red Dragon, the first Hannibal Lecter novel, as a prequel to The Silence of the Lambs. Dino said that people thought he was "crazy" for adapting the book, as it had been previously adapted as Manhunter (1986), with Brian Cox as Lecter. Both Manhunter and Red Dragon had the same cinematographer, Dante Spinotti.

Hopkins hesitated to sign on, worried that three Lecter films might be too much. Screenwriter Ted Tally, who wrote The Silence of the Lambs but not Hannibal, had turned down many offers to write more serial killer stories. He said he liked the idea of Hopkins' Lecter films forming a trilogy: "If it ends here, it will end gracefully. I would hate to see this become Hannibal Lecter XIII." To satisfy expectations, Tally added Lecter scenes not in the novel, describing it as a "commercial reality". He had the support of Harris, who sent Tally dialogue and ideas for scenes. Edward Norton and Ralph Fiennes admired The Silence of the Lambs but had not enjoyed Hannibal. The cast were persuaded to join by Tally's screenplay; Fiennes felt it worked "only on suspense", without overt violence.

Norton and Ratner disagreed on the scene in which Graham approaches the incarcerated Lecter for the first time. Ratner wanted Norton to incorporate a gesture or look to indicate Graham's fear, but Norton felt the audience would not need this if it were filmed correctly. They compromised by showing Graham's sweat stains when he removes his jacket in the next scene. Whereas Fiennes wanted to avoid overplaying his serial killer character, Hopkins aimed to play Lecter with more "danger and rage" than before. Fiennes spent 90 minutes of each day for months building his physique, and wore a prosthetic to give him a cleft palate. The tattoo on his back took around eight hours to apply.

Soundtrack 
Red Dragon: Original Motion Picture Soundtrack was composed by Danny Elfman, and produced by Mark Helfrich and Brett Ratner. Decca Records released it on September 24, 2002, in the United States and Canada.

Reception

Box office 
Red Dragon was released on October 4, 2002, and opened in 3,357 theaters in the United States, grossing $13,478,355 on its opening day and $36,540,945 on its opening weekend, ranking #1 with a per theater average of $10,885. It went on to achieve the highest October opening weekend, beating Meet the Parents. This record was surpassed by Scary Movie 3 the following year. On its second weekend, it remained #1 and grossed $17,655,750 – $5,250 per theater. By its third weekend it dropped down to #3 and made $8,763,545 – $2,649 per theater.

In the UK, Red Dragon collected $4.6 million during its opening weekend, ranking in first place at the box office above Lilo & Stitch.

Red Dragon grossed $93,149,898 in the United States and Canada and $116,046,400 in other territories. In total, the film has grossed $209,196,298 worldwide.

Critical response 
On Rotten Tomatoes the film has an approval rating of 68% based on 190 reviews, with an average rating of 6.40/10. The site's consensus said the film is "competently made, but everything is a bit too familiar". On Metacritic, the film has a weighted average score of 60 out of 100, based on 36 critics, indicating "mixed or average reviews". Audiences polled by CinemaScore gave the film an average grade of "A−" on an A+ to F scale.

Richard Corliss of Time gave the film a positive review, stating: "This darkly seductive, flawlessly acted piece is worlds removed from most horror films. Here monsters have their grandeur, heroes their gravity. And when they collide, a dance of death ensues between two souls doomed to understand each other." Todd McCarthy of Variety also gave the film a positive review, saying that the "audiences will be excused for any feelings of déjà vu the new film might inspire. That won't prevent them from watching it in rapt, anxious silence, however, as the gruesome crimes, twisted psychology and deterministic dread that lie at the heart of Harris' work are laid out with care and skill."

Roger Ebert of Chicago Sun-Times gave the film 3.5 out of four, praising Brett Ratner's directing and the film's atmosphere. He stated: "To my surprise, Ratner does a sure, stylish job, appreciating the droll humor of Lecter's predicament, creating a depraved new villain in the Tooth Fairy (Ralph Fiennes), and using the quiet, intense skills of Norton to create a character whose old fears feed into his new ones. There is also humor, of the uneasy he-can't-get-away-with-this variety, in the character of a nosy scandal-sheet reporter (Philip Seymour Hoffman)." David Sterritt of the Christian Science Monitor gave the film a positive review, stated that "the most refreshing aspect of Red Dragon is its reliance on old-fashioned acting instead of computer-aided gizmos. Hopkins overdoes his role at times—his vocal tones are almost campy—but his piercing eyes are as menacing as ever, and Ralph Fiennes is scarily good as his fellow lunatic."

David Grove of Film Threat, who gave the film four stars out of five, said: "Is Red Dragon a better film than Manhunter? I don't know. I think it stands on its own, but I wonder how much people who are intimately familiar with Manhunter will be shocked by it, although the ending is altogether different and much more realized, I think". Rick Kisonak, who also wrote for Film Threat, also gave the film a positive review, but he gave it three stars out of five, saying: "The only downside to this delectable third course? The regrettable likelihood that Lecter fans will have to make do without dessert."

Edward Guthmann of San Francisco Chronicle, gave the film a mixed review, saying that "in Hollywood, where integrity is rapidly consumed and careers defined by market value, there's trash and there's trash with a pedigree." Stephanie Zacharek, for Salon, also gave the film a mixed review, stating: "If you buy the overprocessed headcheese of the serial killer as refined genius, you'll love Red Dragon. Or maybe not. Even Hannibal Lecter devotees may lose patience with this picture's grandiose, self-serious ponderousness—that's Lecterese for, 'It's kind of boring in patches, actually.'" William Arnold of Seattle Post-Intelligencer, who gave the film a mixed review, said that the film "basically lives up to the old adage that the final work in a trilogy is invariably the weakest." Michael Atkinson of The Village Voice gave the film a negative review; he stated: "Red Dragons formula is so risible and rote by now that the natural reaction to scenes of peril, torture, and suffering is flippant laughter."

Home media
The film was released on VHS and DVD on April 1, 2003. It was released in two extras-packed DVD editions, a single-disc package and two-disc "Director's Edition". The single-disc package includes deleted scenes, director's commentary by Brett Ratner, Interview with FBI profiler John E. Douglas, Four featurettes: "The Hannibal Lecter Story," "The Making of Red Dragon," "The Art of Criminal Profiling" and "The Making of a Killer". The Director's Edition includes Ratner's video diary, featurette "The Red Dragon Tattoo", screen and film tests, and storyboard-to-final-feature comparisons.

Awards 

Red Dragon was nominated for 13 awards, and won several, including Empire Award for Best British Actress (Emily Watson) and Young Artist Award for Best Performance in a Feature Film – Young Actor Age Ten or Younger (Tyler Patrick Jones).

See also
 List of films featuring home invasions

Notes

References

External links 

 
 
 

2002 films
2002 horror films
2002 crime drama films
2002 crime thriller films
2000s horror thriller films
2000s psychological drama films
2002 psychological thriller films
2002 thriller drama films
American crime drama films
American crime thriller films
American horror thriller films
American psychological drama films
American psychological thriller films
American serial killer films
American thriller drama films
English-language German films
German horror thriller films
German thriller drama films
2000s English-language films
Films about cannibalism
Fiction about familicide
Films about the Federal Bureau of Investigation
Films scored by Danny Elfman
Films based on American horror novels
Films set in Baltimore
Films set in St. Louis
Films set in 1980
Hannibal Lecter films
Remakes of American films
Interquel films
Universal Pictures films
Metro-Goldwyn-Mayer films
Films directed by Brett Ratner
Films with screenplays by Ted Tally
Films produced by Dino De Laurentiis
Films produced by Martha De Laurentiis
German psychological thriller films
2000s American films
American prequel films
German prequel films
2000s German films